The George Woolf Memorial Jockey Award has been presented by Santa Anita Park in Arcadia, California, annually since 1950 to the thoroughbred horse racing jockey in North America who demonstrates high standards of personal and professional conduct both on and off the racetrack.

The award was created through donations from the racing public after the death of Hall of Fame jockey George Woolf. The one-time-only award is voted on by members of the Jockeys' Guild who chose from among their peers nominated by Guild regional managers. The trophy that goes along with the award is a one-foot-high replica of the life-size statue of George Woolf that, along with a bronze sculpture of his favorite mount, Seabiscuit, has a place of honor in the Santa Anita Paddock Gardens.

Past winners: 
2023  :  Javier Castellano
2022  :  Joe Bravo
2021  :  Deshawn L. Parker
2020  :  Luis M. Quinones
2019  :  Scott Stevens
2018  :  José C. Ferrer
2017  :  Stewart Elliott
2016  :  Victor Espinoza
2015  :  Mike Luzzi
2014  :  Corey Lanerie
2013  :  Mario G. Pino
2012  :  Ramon A. Dominguez
2011  :  Garrett K. Gomez
2010  :  Calvin Borel
2009  :  John Velazquez
2008  :  Richard Migliore
2007  :  Jon Court
2006  :  Mark Guidry
2005  :  Ray Sibille
2004  :  Robby Albarado
2003  :  Edgar Prado
2002  :  Russell Baze
2001  :  Dean Kutz
2000  :  Mike E. Smith
1999  :  José A. Santos
1998  :  Craig Perret
1997  :  Alex Solis
1996  :  Gary Stevens
1995  :  Eddie Maple
1994  :  Phil Grove
1993  :  Kent Desormeaux
1992  :  Jerry Bailey
1991  :  Earlie Fires
1990  :  John L. Lively
1989  :  Larry Snyder
1988  :  Don Brumfield
1987  :  Don MacBeth
1986  :  Jorge Velásquez
1985  :  Pat Day
1984  :  Steve Cauthen

1983  :  Marco Castaneda
1982  :  Pat Valenzuela
1981  :  Eddie Delahoussaye
1980  :  Chris McCarron
1979  :  Ron Turcotte
1978  :  Darrel McHargue
1977  :  Frank Olivares
1976  :  Sandy Hawley
1975  :  Fernando Toro
1974  :  Álvaro Pineda
1973  :  John L. Rotz
1972  :  Ángel Cordero Jr.
1971  :  Jerry Lambert
1970  :  Laffit Pincay Jr.
1969  :  Johnny Sellers
1968  :  Braulio Baeza
1967  :  Donald R. Pierce
1966  :  Alex Maese
1965  :  Walter Blum
1964  :  Manuel Ycaza
1963  :  Ismael Valenzuela
1962  :  Steve Brooks
1961  :  Peter Moreno
1960  :  William Harmatz
1959  :  William Boland
1958  :  Merlin Volzke
1957  :  Ted Atkinson
1956  :  John H. Adams
1955  :  Raymond York
1954  :  Ralph Neves
1953  :  Eddie Arcaro
1952  :  Johnny Longden
1951  :  Bill Shoemaker
1950  :  Gordon Glisson

References

American horse racing awards